The Klondike Big Inch Land promotion was a  marketing promotion run by the Quaker Oats Company in 1955 and created by Bruce Baker, a Chicago advertising executive.

Inception 
On advice of counsel, Quaker Oats set up and transferred the land to the Great Klondike Big Inch Land Company to make the company the registered owner and manager of the deeds.

Starting in January 1955, 93 newspapers across the United States ran advertisements that read "Get a real deed to one square inch of land in the Yukon gold rush country" and "You'll actually own one square inch of Yukon land". The promotion was tied to the Sergeant Preston of the Yukon television show which Quaker Oats was sponsoring at the time.

Scrooge McDuck Comic Book 
In 1956, there was an Uncle Scrooge McDuck comic book story inspired by the Big Inch Land promotion. When Scrooge visits his square inch of land in Texas, a prairie dog with engine oil on its feet leads Scrooge to believe there is oil under his land. Donald Duck and his kids buy cereal boxes around the country to obtain the neighboring square inches so Scrooge can drill for the oil that wasn't there.

Obtaining deeds 
The promotion instructed people to mail a form along with a box top from either Quaker Puffed Wheat, Quaker Puffed Rice or Muffets Shredded Wheat to the Quaker Oats company.  In turn, a  deed to one square inch of land in the Klondike was sent back.  In February 1955, Quaker Oats was blocked from trading the deed for a box top by the Ohio Securities Division until it received a state license for the "sale" of foreign land. To get around the injunction, the company stopped the trade-in offer and instead put one of the deeds in each box of cereal produced.

Since none of the deeds were actually registered, the documents were never legally binding and owners of these deeds were never actual owners of any land.  The deed excluded mineral rights on the property.

Afterwards 
Due to $37.20 in back taxes, the land was repossessed by the Canadian government in 1965, and the Great Klondike Big Inch Land Company dissolved in 1966.  The land is now part of the Dawson City Golf Course.

To this day, Yukon officials receive letters and phone calls about the deeds. The land office of the Yukon currently contains an  file folder of correspondence regarding the promotion.

See also
 Challenge of the Yukon, the radio show tied to the Klondike Big Inch Land promotion
 Dawson City, the city the land is situated on.

References

External links
 Picture of the original advertisement in the Seattle Times on the Yukon Government Website

History of Yukon
Advertisements
1955 in the United States
1955 in Canada
Quaker Oats Company
1955 in Yukon